Jindřichovice may refer to places in the Czech Republic:

Jindřichovice (Jihlava District), a municipality and village in the Vysočina Region
Jindřichovice (Sokolov District), a municipality and village in the Karlovy Vary Region
Jindřichovice, a village and part of Blatná in the South Bohemian Region
Jindřichovice, a village and part of Kolinec in the Plzeň Region
Jindřichovice pod Smrkem, a municipality and village in the Liberec Region